Aram Abbasi is an Iranian football defender who plays for Havadar F.C.

In the Iran Pro League. Abbasi started his career with Fajr Sepasi from youth levels. He joined Saba Qom on July 27, 2014 with a 2-year contract. He made his debut against Sepahan on September 18, 2014 as a substitute for Hossein Badamaki.

References

External links
 Aram Abbasi at IranLeague.ir

1994 births
Living people
Iranian footballers
Saba players
Havadar S.C. players
People from Sanandaj
Iran under-20 international footballers
Association football defenders